Montrell Craft (born August 14, 1987 in Memphis, Tennessee) is a defensive tackle who is currently a free agent. He most recently played for the Alabama Hammers of the Professional Indoor Football League. Craft signed as a free agent with the BC Lions on May 18, 2010. He currently coaches football at New Bolivar Central High School in Bolivar, TN. He and his twin brother, Marcell Craft, played college football for the North Alabama Lions and both became members of Phi Beta Sigma fraternity.

References

1987 births
Living people
African-American players of Canadian football
American players of Canadian football
BC Lions players
Canadian football defensive linemen
Players of Canadian football from Memphis, Tennessee
American twins
Twin sportspeople
Alabama Hammers players
North Alabama Lions football players
21st-century African-American sportspeople
20th-century African-American people